Lilly is a surname. Notable people with the surname include:

 Armistead Abraham Lilly (1878–1956), American lawyer, politician, and businessperson
 Bob Lilly (born 1939), American football player and photographer
 Doris Lilly (1922-1991), writer ("How to Marry a Millionaire," "How to Make Love in Five Languages", etc.) 
 Edward P. Lilly (1910–1994), American historian, founder of the CIA Psychological Bureau Services
 Eli Lilly (1839–1898), pharmaceutical chemist, founder of Eli Lilly and Company
 Evangeline Lilly (born 1979), Canadian actress
 Gweneth Lilly (1920–2004), Welsh writer and teacher
 Jim Lilly (born 1981), American politician
 John Lilly (Mozilla) (born 1971), CEO of the Mozilla Corporation
 John Lilly (writer) (c. 1553–1606), English writer
 John C. Lilly (1915–2001), American neuroscientist and philosopher
 Josiah K. Lilly, Jr. (1893–1966), American industrialist
 Josiah K. Lilly, Sr. (1861–1948), American industrialist
 Ken Lilly (birb 1959), Australian cricketer
 Kenneth Norman Lilly (1929–1996), British artist
 Kevin Lilly (born 1963), American football player
 Kristine Lilly (born 1971), American soccer player
 Mike Lilly, American comic book artist
 Paul Douglas Lilly (born 1969), American judge
 Ted Lilly (born 1976), American former baseball pitcher
 Thomas Jefferson Lilly (1878–1956), American politician
 William Lilly (1602–1681), English astrologer